Nocardioides humi is a Gram-positive, aerobic, rod-shaped and motile bacterium from the genus Nocardioides which has been isolated from soil from a ginseng field in Korea. Nocardioides humi produces beta-glucosidase.

References

Further reading

External links
Type strain of Nocardioides humi at BacDive -  the Bacterial Diversity Metadatabase	

humi
Bacteria described in 2009